Dinner and a Movie is an American cooking and entertainment television program aired on TBS from 1995 to 2011.

Each episode included a movie and the preparation of a creative dinner to go with its theme, generally via a pun. For example, an episode showing Drumline features a recipe titled "The Beets Go On", referencing the Sonny & Cher single "The Beat Goes On", as well as the plot of the movie about a drummer who tries to fit in with a new marching band.

The show was hosted by chef Claud Mann and comedian Paul Gilmartin throughout its run, as well as Annabelle Gurwitch from 1996–2002, Lisa Kushell from 2002–2005 and Janet Varney from 2005 to the show's end in 2011.

The show's cancellation was announced by Gilmartin on the May 6 edition of his podcast, The Mental Illness Happy Hour.

See also
 Casino Cinema (similar movie program on Spike TV)

External links
 

1990s American cooking television series
2000s American cooking television series
2010s American cooking television series
American motion picture television series
TBS (American TV channel) original programming
1995 American television series debuts
2011 American television series endings
Television series by Studio T